Anya Susannah Hindmarch,  (born 1968) is an English fashion accessories designer who founded an eponymous company.

Career
Hindmarch was born into an entrepreneurial family and attended New Hall School, an independent school in Chelmsford, Essex. At 16 Hindmarch was given an old Gucci handbag by her mother and at 18, in around 1986, she went to Florence to study Italian for a year.

While she was in Italy, she noticed a drawstring leather duffel bag was all the rage among fashionable women.  Even though the UK economy was in a recession, she was inspired by Margaret Thatcher's entrepreneurial ideas,  Hindmarch borrowed some money to import some bags to England, and after sending a bag to the fashion magazine Harpers and Queen she sold 500 through the magazine.  She initially had bags manufactured in Italy, but when the factory started selling bags of her design directly to retailers, she started having her own bags made in Hackney. By 1992 her bags were sold at luxury stores in London, New York, Japan, France and Italy.  In 1993 she opened a small retail shop in Walton Street. Her early products were influenced by Italian design, and she describes her products as having high-quality of workmanship, and as representing a design philosophy which is "British, humorous and personalised."

In 1996 she married James Seymour, a widower with three children, and he joined the company soon after as its finance director.

In 2001 Hindmarch launched her "Be A Bag" line, a service by which a bag is personalised with a customer's photograph, initially to support a breast cancer awareness group, but subsequently to benefit other charitable causes.

In 2006 the company took on outside investors, and was valued at $38 million.

In 2007 Hindmarch launched a limited-edition tote bag with the words "I'm NOT A Plastic bag", using her influence to make it fashionable not to use plastic bags. The canvas totes sold for £5, launching in four limited edition colours around the world, and were selected by Vanity Fair to be included in their "Oscars" goodie bags.

In 2008, Hindmarch launched a limited edition handbag for US retailer Target.  In the same year, Hindmarch collaborated with Selfridges to design a collection of Christmas hampers.

In 2009, her company opened a bespoke workshop at its Pont Street store in London.  By that time, the company was headquartered in Battersea, in the converted stable block of a former brewery. By 2009, she had 51 stores worldwide with an estimated sales of £20 million.

In 2013, Anya Hindmarch opened its New York flagship store on Madison Avenue that sold both manufactured and bespoke bags.

In 2019, Anya Hindmarch became a Greenpeace Ambassador. 

In 2020, The Telegraph reported that Hindmarch had regained a joint ownership of the company after returning to lead a turnaround.

Awards
In 2006, 2007, and 2015 Hindmarch won Designer of the Year by Glamour magazine,  and became the first winner of the Designer brand of the Year at the 2007 British Fashion Awards, having been named Accessories Designer of the Year at the same awards in 2001. She won the British Fashion Award for Accessory Designer again in 2014 and the Elle Awards in 2016.

She was appointed Member of the Order of the British Empire (MBE) in 2009 for services to the British fashion industry and Commander of the Order of the British Empire (CBE) in the 2017 New Year Honours for services to fashion.

Hindmarch was made a UK trade ambassador in 2011, is a Birthday Honours Committee member and is on the Advisory Board for the Mayor of London.

In 2011, Hindmarch became an Honorary Doctor of Arts at Anglia Ruskin University. 

In April 2012, Hindmarch was named Veuve Cliquot businesswoman of the year.

As of 2013 Hindmarch was a trustee of both the Royal Academy and the Design Museum

References

External links

Hindmarch's personal tips on how to organise your handbag at The Telegraph

1968 births
British women fashion designers
Commanders of the Order of the British Empire
English businesspeople in fashion
English fashion designers
Living people
People educated at Elm Green Preparatory School
People from Maldon, Essex